Nemichand Jhabak is an Indian film production and distribution company headed by Nemichand Jhabak and V. Hitesh Jhabak.

History 
Producer Nemichand Jhabak's father owned the negative rights for several Tamil classic films. Subsequently since 2000, the Jhabaks have been involved in a long-running legal battle against the Sun TV Network regarding the over-priced sale of the television rights of the films.

The Jhabaks made their production debut with Naan Avanillai (2007), a remake of the yesteryear film. The film was a success, as was the studio's second film, Anjathe (2008) by Mysskin. However, their following films Pandi, Pokkisham and Pandhayam, which was distributed by them, all failed at the box office prompting Hitesh Jhabak to attempt suicide in August 2009. In 2011, Hitesh Jhabak filed a complaint against Hansraj Saxena of Sun Pictures for extortion and cheating during the making of Mappillai. Likewise, after the failure of Vanmam (2014), Hitesh Jhabak publicly thanked actor Arya for forgoing his payment for his work in Meaghamann (2014) to ensure the film was released. In 2015, producer Nemichand Jhabak spoke out against the rising costs of film production and the unfavourable conditions requested by actors. Including their first film, they have made ten films in a decade, with the most recent being the first Indian space film, Tik Tik Tik (2018) starring Jayam Ravi and Nivetha Pethuraj.

Filmography 
Production

Distribution
Pandhayam (2008)
Podaa Podi (2012)

References

External links

Facebook page
Film distributors of India
Film production companies based in Chennai
2007 establishments in Tamil Nadu
Mass media companies established in 2007
Indian companies established in 2007